The 1958 Mars Bluff B-47 nuclear weapon loss incident was the inadvertent release of a nuclear weapon from a United States Air Force B-47 bomber over Mars Bluff, South Carolina. The bomb, which lacked the fissile nuclear core, fell over the area, causing damage to buildings below. Though there was no nuclear detonation, six people were injured by the explosion of the bomb's conventional explosives. The Air Force was sued by the family of the victims, who received , .

Description of incident 
On March 11, 1958, a U.S. Air Force Boeing B-47E-LM Stratojet from Hunter Air Force Base operated by the 375th Bombardment Squadron of the 308th Bombardment Wing near Savannah, Georgia, took off at approximately 4:34 PM and was scheduled to fly to the United Kingdom and then to North Africa as part of Operation Snow Flurry. The aircraft was carrying nuclear weapons on board in the event of war with the Soviet Union breaking out. Air Force Captain Bruce Kulka, who was the navigator and bombardier, was summoned to the bomb bay area after the captain of the aircraft, Captain Earl Koehler, had encountered a fault light in the cockpit indicating that the bomb harness locking pin did not engage. As Kulka reached around the bomb to pull himself up, he mistakenly grabbed the emergency release pin. The Mark 6 nuclear bomb dropped to the bomb bay doors of the B-47 and the weight forced the doors open, sending the bomb  down to the ground below.

Two sisters, six-year-old Helen and nine-year-old Frances Gregg, along with their nine-year-old cousin Ella Davies, were playing  from a playhouse in the woods that had been built for them by their father Walter Gregg, who had served as a paratrooper during World War II. The playhouse was struck by the bomb. Fortunately, the fissile nuclear core was stored elsewhere on the aircraft. All three girls were injured by the explosion, as were Walter, his wife Effie and son Walter Jr. Seven nearby buildings were damaged. The United States Air Force (USAF) was sued by the family of the victims, who received $54,000. The incident made domestic and international headlines.

See also 
 List of military nuclear accidents

References

External links 
 "'Dead' A-Bomb Hits US Town", Universal Newsreel story, Internet Archive.
 Florence County Museum

Mars Bluff B-47 nuclear weapon loss incident
Mars bluff
Mars Bluff B-47 nuclear weapon loss incident
Aviation accidents and incidents in the United States in 1958
Mars bluff
Mars bluff
Mars Bluff
Mars bluff
Mars bluff
Nuclear accidents and incidents in the United States